Fangcheng is a county in the east of Nanyang City's administrative area, in the southwest of Henan province, China, has an area of  and a population of 970,000 as of 2002.

Administrative divisions
As 2012, this county is divided to 7 towns, 8 townships and 1 ethic township.
Towns

Townships

Ethnic townships
Yuandian Hui Township

Climate

References

External links
Official website of Fangcheng County Government

County-level divisions of Henan
Nanyang, Henan